The Nutbush is a line dance performed to Tina Turner's song "Nutbush City Limits".

Inspired by Tina Turner's song, the dance emerged as "The Nutbush" in the 1970s disco era. The Nutbush particularly took off in Australia during the 1980s, and is usually performed in schools, social gatherings and community events. The dance has gained such popularity in Australia that it has been implemented in some Australian states' curricula. In 2019 and 2020, the dance saw widespread attention when it was the subject of various viral TikTok videos.

The dance is generally performed by a group of people of all genders and ages at a social function. Also, the dance is performed with the dancers roughly in a box configuration, like that of a chessboard.

The steps are fairly simple, such that one who does not know them can generally pick them up by watching other dancers. A key in the song and dance being a popular combination is that the song has a moderately long introduction before the strong dance beat starts, which allows people who are sitting down to get up and to the dance floor and for all dancers to assemble themselves in a grid. For comparison, see the song "Do The Bus Stop".

Implementation

The steps to the dance are as follows: 
 hands are generally placed akimbo and feet shoulder-width apart in a neutral position. The following moves take place on the beat of the drum during the song.
 the dancers have their weight on the left leg and the right foot is moving: touch their foot to the ground right, and then returned to the initial stance. Repeat once (two touches). Weight is changed to the right leg and step is repeated with the left foot, touching left, return, and repeat once. (eight beats)
 the dancers then change weight back to left leg and move their foot back half a pace, touch, and return to the original stance. Twice touch on the right foot and twice with the left. (eight beats)
 the right knee is brought across the body to approximately the height of the left hip twice, continuing with the left knee to right hip twice. (eight beats)
 this is followed by a single kick of the right leg across the body and following with the left. (four beats)
 and finally, the last four beats of the song are colloquially known as "turn-and-clap" whereupon the dancers turn clockwise ¼, pause, then clap.

Variations of the final step are known to occur. For example, jumping both feet out (beat 1), jumping and crossing over your legs (beat 2), then uncrossing out to the side (beat 3), and finally "do the clap." (beat 4) This variation is known as the criss-cross.

World record attempts
In 2015, dancers in the Victorian town of Horsham set the first Guinness World Record for the number of people doing the Nutbush, with 254 dancers. On 19 October 2017, students at Rivermount College in Yatala, Queensland doubled this record with 522 dancers. On 12 July 2018 the record was broken again at The Big Red Bash, a music festival situated beneath the Big Red Dune on the edge of the Simpson Desert in outback Queensland. Crowds lined up to take part, dancing along to "Nutbush City Limits" as 1,719 people took part in the challenge. On 16 July 2019, a new record of 2,330 people performed the Nutbush at the Big Red Bash, breaking the previous year's record. On 7th July 2022, a new record of 4,087 people performed the Nutbush at the Big Red Bash, breaking the previous record.

References

External links
Guinness World Record broken

Line dances
Novelty and fad dances
Tina Turner
Dance in Australia